Isaac Goldberg (1887 – July 14, 1938) was an American journalist, author, critic, translator, editor, publisher, and lecturer. Born in Boston to Jewish parents, he studied at Harvard University and received a BA degree in 1910, a MA degree in 1911 and a PhD in 1912. He traveled to Europe as a journalist during World War I writing for the Boston Evening Transcript.

He wrote biographies of H. L. Mencken, Havelock Ellis, W. S. Gilbert, Arthur Sullivan, and George Gershwin, books on theatrical and musical appreciation, books of Spanish -American Literature and contributed articles for many magazines. He also founded, published, and edited a monthly news magazine called Panorama.

He was fluent in Yiddish, Spanish, French, German, Italian, and Portuguese and translated a variety of literary works into English. He received a fellowship from the Guggenheim Foundation in 1932 to write a history of Spanish and Portuguese literature in America.

Selected works 

 Studies in Spanish-American literature,   New York, Brentano's 1920 
 The drama of transition; native and exotic playcraft, Cincinnati : Stewart Kidd company c1922
 Brazilian literature. New York, A. A. Knopf 1922 Reprinted  Gordon Press 1975
 The theatre of George Jean Nathan : chapters and documents toward a history of the new American drama New York : Simon and Schuster 1926
 The story of Gilbert and Sullivan New York, Simon and Schuster, 1928
 The wonder of words; an introduction to language for everyman,   New York, London, D. Appleton-Century Company, incorporated 1938
 George Gershwin : a study in American music   New York : Simon and Schuster 1931, Reprinted  F. Ungar Pub. Co. 1958
 Major Noah: American-Jewish pioneer,  Philadelphia, New York : Knopf 1937, (about Noah, M. M. (Mordecai Manuel), 1785-1851
 (with Isidore Witmark) . The Story of the House of Witmark: From Ragtime to Swingtime. New York: L. Furman, 1939. Print.

References

External links 
  (as translator)
 
 

American male journalists
Jewish American journalists
Harvard University alumni
1887 births
1938 deaths
Translators to English
Yiddish-speaking people
20th-century American translators